Kanta Kardam is an Indian politician. She is a Member of Parliament  representing Uttar Pradesh in the Rajya Sabha the upper house of India's Parliament representing the Bharatiya Janata Party.

References

Living people
Rajya Sabha members from Uttar Pradesh
Bharatiya Janata Party politicians from Uttar Pradesh
Women in Uttar Pradesh politics
Year of birth missing (living people)
Women members of the Rajya Sabha